Adolf von Wilbrandt (24 August 183710 June 1911) was a German novelist and dramatist.

History
Wilbrandt was born in Rostock.  His father was a professor at the University of Rostock. He received early education in his native town, and then entered the university and engaged in the study of law. He soon abandoned law in favour of philology and history, and continued these studies in Berlin and Munich. After taking the degree of Doctor of Philosophy, he joined the staff of the Süddeutsche Zeitung in Munich.

He travelled abroad for a time and in 1871 he settled in Vienna, where, two years later, he married the actress, Auguste Baudius. In 1881, Wilbrandt was appointed director of the Hofburg theatre in succession to Franz von Dingelstedt, an office he held until 1887. In this year he returned to his native town, and remained actively engaged in literary production.

Wilbrandt is distinguished both as a dramatist and novelist. His merits were acknowledged by the award of the Franz Grillparzer Prize on two occasions—in 1895 for the tragedy Gracchus der Volkstribun, and in 1890 for his dramatic poem Der Meister von Palmyra, while in 1878 he received the Schiller Prize for his dramatic productions.

Works

Novels
Fridolins heimliche Ehe (1875)
Meister Amor (1880)
Hermann Ifinger (1892)
Der Dornenweg (1894)
Die Osterinsel (1895)
Die Rothenburger (1895)
Hildegard Mahlmann (1897)

Plays
Tragedies
Arria and Messalina (1874)
Nero (1876)
Kriemhild (1877)
Comedies
Unerreichbar (1870)
Die Maler (1872)
Jugendliebe (1873)
Der Kampf ums Dasein (1874)
Drama
Die Tochter des Herrn Fabricius (1883).

He also published translations of Sophocles and Euripides (1866), Gedichte (Poems, 1894, 1889 and 1907), and a volume of Erinnerungen (Memoirs, 1905).

Literature 
Franz Horch: Das Burgtheater unter Laube und Wilbrandt. Wien: Österreichischer Bundesverlag 1925.
Karl Jacobs: Die Dramendichtung Adolf Wilbrandts in zeitgeschichtlicher und -kritischer Darstellung. Köln: Univ. Diss. 1929.
Victor Klemperer: Adolf Wilbrandt. Eine Studie über seine Werke. Stuttgart u.a. 1907.
Eduard Scharrer-Santen: Adolf Wilbrandt als Dramatiker, München: Sachs u.a. 1912.
Robert Wilbrandt: Mein Vater Adolf Wilbrandt. Berlin u.a.: Österreichischer Wirtschaftsverlag 1937.

References

Attribution:

External links 

 homowiki.de (in German): On the novel Fridolin's Mystical Marriage

1837 births
1911 deaths
19th-century German novelists
Humboldt University of Berlin alumni
Ludwig Maximilian University of Munich alumni
University of Rostock alumni
German male novelists
German male dramatists and playwrights
19th-century German dramatists and playwrights
19th-century German male writers